Vishwas Patil (born 28 November 1959, in Nerle, Kolhapur district)  is an Indian author and an officer in Indian Administrative Services. He completed his masters M.A. in English Literature and a degree in Law.

Works
Lust for Lalbaug, novel about Great Bombay textile strike publisher Rajhans Prakashan, 2015
Panipat, novel about Third Battle of Panipat
Sambhaji, biographical novel about Sambhaji
Ranangan, play based on novel Panipat
Chandramukhi, novel based on relations between a politician and a "tamasha" dancer
Not gone with the wind, novel based on the film industry personalities
Pangira, novel about hardship of village people
Mahanayak, biographical novel about Netaji Subhash Chandra Bose
Zadazadati (novel), a touching story of people displaced due to infrastructure projects like dams, it was honoured with Sahitya Akademi Award in 1992,

Awards
1989Nath Madhav Award for Panipat
1990 Priyadarshini National Award for Zadazadati, Bhartiya Bhasha Parishad Award for Panipat, Vikhe Patil Award for Zadazadati
1992 Sahitya Akademi Award for Zadazadati
1998 Gadakri Award for Mahanayak

References

1959 births
Living people
Patil, Vishwas Mahipati
Recipients of the Sahitya Akademi Award in Marathi
Indian Administrative Service officers
People from Kolhapur district